The Meredyth family (sometimes spelled Meredith) were an Anglo-Irish family descending from Richard Meredith, a Welsh clergyman who went to Ireland in 1584 and became Bishop of Leighlin.

References

Anglo-Irish families
 *